The Integrated Defence Staff (IDS) is an organisation responsible for fostering coordination and enabling prioritisation across the different branches of the Indian Armed Forces. It is composed of representatives from the Indian Army, Indian Navy, Indian Air Force, Ministry of External Affairs, Defence Research and Development Organisation, Ministry of Defence and Ministry of Finance. The IDS is headed by Chief of Integrated Defence Staff along with Deputy Chiefs of Integrated Defence Staff. On December 24, 2019, the Cabinet Committee on Security (CCS) established the post of Chief of Defence Staff, a four-star general, a tri-service Chief, that shall lead the defence forces as well as play the role of head of the Department of Military Affairs.
The body advises and assists the Chief of Defence Staff.

Role and Responsibilities 
Roles of the IDS includes facilitating the efficient functioning of multi-service bodies,   providing secretarial and domain expertise to the Minister of Defence in all proposals of capital defence procurements and providing the building of cooperation through intra-service deliberations for procurements, joint doctrines, joint training and common procedures. The Defence Cyber Agency, the Defence Space Agency, Armed Forces Special Operations Division and the Armed Force Strategic Missile/Rocket Command, will function under the IDS.

The colour of jointmanship of the three services is purple, hence, the term 'Purple Fraternity' is applied to their ranks.

History 

Post-independence, a military wing was created inside the Cabinet Secretariat. The wing was later shifted to the Ministry of Defence. The wing was headed by Joint Secretary (Military), a major general (or equivalent)-level officer, who was responsible for keeping the Cabinet Secretary informed through the Defence Secretary about defence-related issues and had various other responsibilities including on coordination-related matters.

The Defence Planning Staff was established under the Ministry of Defence in 1986 to provide assistance to the Chiefs of Staff Committee. Comprising representatives from the Ministry of External Affairs, the Ministry of Defence (including onescientist from the Defence Research and Development Organisation) and the Ministry of Finance, the organisation was headed by Director General Defence Planning Staff (DG DPS), a lieutenant general (or equivalent)-level position held in rotation by the threeservices, and had fivedivisions. The DG DPS had the status of a vice chief of staff.

After the Kargil War between India and Pakistan, the Kargil Review Committee (KRC) was set up by the Government of India on 29July1999 under the chairpersonship of retired Indian Administrative Service officer and former Defence Production Secretary, K. Subrahmanyam. The committee submitted its report to the prime minister, Atal Bihari Vajpayee, on 7January2000 and was tabled in the Parliament of India on 23February2000.

Following KRC's report, a group of ministers (GoM) was set up on 17April2000 to consider the recommendations in the Kargil Review Committee Report, as well as to review national security more thoroughly. The GoM consisted of L. K. Advani, George Fernandes, Jaswant Singh, Yashwant Sinha, the ministers of home affairs, defence, external affairs and finance, respectively. Brajesh Mishra, National Security Advisor, was assigned as a special guest to the meetings of the GoM and the Cabinet Secretariat (National Security Council Secretariat) provided any help required. The GoM came out with its own report, "Reforming the National Security System". The GoM report was submitted by them to Prime Minister Vajpayee on 26February2001.

Pursuant to the recommendations of the KRC and GoM, as well as prior recommendations by the Standing Committee on Defence of the Parliament of India, the Government of India constituted the Integrated Defence Staff under the Ministry of Defence through a notification on 23November2001. The Defence Planning Staff and the Military Wing inside the Ministry of Defence were merged into IDS.

IDS celebrates its raising day on 1October every year, 2018 being the 18th.

Organisational structure 
The body is headed by the Chief of Integrated Defence Staff who is Vice Chief of Staff rank level officer and is also Vice Chief of Defense Staff. It consists of various branches, divisions and directorates. The CIDS is assisted by designated deputy chiefs of integrated staff, who are lieutenant general (or equivalent)-level officers and head different branches. An assistant chief of integrated defence staff—major general (or equivalent)-level officer—heads a division whilst a deputy assistant chief of integrated staff heads a directorate. The organisation is staffed by officers and personnel from the threeservices, together with officials from the Ministry of External Affairs and the Defence Accounts Department and the Defence Research and Development Organisation of the Ministry of Defence.

Headquarters 
The Headquarters of the Integrated Defence Staff (HQ IDS) is located in New Delhi. The Chiefs of Staff Committee (COSC), its secretariat and certain other components are situated in South Block, Secretariat Building, New Delhi. The major portion of the HQ IDS is located in Kashmir House, New Delhi. The HQ IDS functions as the secretariat to the chairman of COSC.

The new HQ Integrated Defence Staff building complex is at Mehram Nagar, Delhi Cantonment.

See also 
 Integrated entities 
 Defence Planning Committee, tri-services command at policy level with NSA as its chief 
 Defence Cyber Agency, tri-services command
 Defence Space Agency, draws staff from all 3 services of Indian Armed Forces
 Armed Force Strategic Missile/Rocket Command, upcoming tri-services missile/rocket command
 Armed Forces Special Operations Division, tri-services command at operational level under Integrated Defense Staff
 Indian Nuclear Command Authority
 Strategic Forces Command, nuclear command of India
 Andaman and Nicobar Command, first operational tri-services command

 Assets
 List of Indian Air Force stations
 List of Indian Navy bases
 List of active Indian Navy ships
 India's overseas military bases

 Other nations
 Special Operations Forces Command (KSSO) - Russian equivalent command
 Joint Special Operations Command (JSOC) - U.S. equivalent command

 General concepts
 Joint warfare, general concept
 Minimum Credible Deterrence
 List of cyber warfare forces of other nations

References

Bibliography 
 
 Controller of Defence Accounts (Integrated Defence Staff). Defence Accounts Department Office Manual 2014 Edition Chapter 1. The Controller General of Defence Accounts. National Informatics Centre.

2001 establishments in India
Government agencies established in 2001
Military units and formations of India
Military units and formations established in 2001
Joint military units and formations of India